Beatrice Faye Cancio Nicolas (born April 15, 1994) is a Filipino former child actress in film and television. Her older sister is former child actress Iwi Nicolas. Bea Nicolas is a licensed Medical technologist.

Filmography

Television

Film

References

External links

Filipino film actresses
Filipino television actresses
Living people
Star Magic
1994 births